LaTanya Chantella White (born September 27, 1982) is a professional basketball player. Born in Tupelo, Mississippi, White is 5'7" (1.70 m) tall and weighs 154 lb (70 kg). She received the Frances Pomeroy Naismith Award from the Women's Basketball Coaches Association as the best senior player under 5 ft 8 in (1.7 m) in 2005.

Mississippi State statistics
Source

WNBA career
White was selected by the Indiana Fever in the first round (2nd pick overall) of the 2005 WNBA Draft. White was waived by the Fever before the 2009 WNBA season began. Three weeks into the season, she was signed by the Connecticut Sun. She was signed by the Minnesota Lynx prior to the 2014 season.

WNBA career statistics

Regular season

|-
| align="left" | 2005
| align="left" | Indiana
| 34 || 3 || 20.4 || .335 || .309 || .810 || 1.6 || 1.6 || 0.9 || 0.2 || 2.1 || 7.1
|-
| align="left" | 2006
| align="left" | Indiana
| 34 || 0 || 21.6 || .372 || .216 || .750 || 2.4 || 1.5 || 0.8 || 0.3 || 1.5 || 8.9
|-
| align="left" | 2007
| align="left" | Indiana
| 34 || 9 || 24.7 || .386 || .339 || .841 || 2.6 || 1.9 || 1.1 || 0.3 || 2.9 || 10.8
|-
| align="left" | 2008
| align="left" | Indiana
| 33 || 22 || 27.1 || .366 || .325 || .850 || 3.1 || 2.4 || 1.3 || 0.4 || 2.6 || 9.9
|-
| align="left" | 2009
| align="left" | Connecticut
| 30 || 15 || 22.0 || .393 || .377 || .840 || 2.7 || 2.2 || 1.2 || 0.3 || 1.2 || 9.5
|-
| align="left" | 2010
| align="left" | Connecticut
| 34 || 10 || 25.2 || .420 || .366 || .800 || 2.7 || 2.3 || 1.6 || 0.1 || 1.6 || 10.1
|-
| align="left" | 2011
| align="left" | Connecticut
| 34 || 0 || 22.0 || .354 || .280 || .840 || 2.9 || 1.9 || 1.2 || 0.2 || 1.2 || 5.9
|-
| align="left" | 2012
| align="left" | Connecticut
| 31 || 0 || 16.0 || .399 || .403 || .833 || 1.6 || 1.1 || 1.0 || 0.2 || 1.2 || 5.0
|-
| align="left" | 2013
| align="left" | Connecticut
| 22 || 12 || 25.0 || .329 || .197 || .741 || 2.8 || 2.0 || 1.5 || 0.3 || 2.4 || 9.2
|-
| align="left" | 2014
| align="left" | Minnesota
| 34 || 1 || 17.8 || .400 || .333 || .739 || 1.8 || 1.1 || 0.9 || 0.1 || 0.9 || 4.9
|-
| align="left" | Career
| align="left" | 10 years, 3 teams
| 320 || 72 || 22.1 || .375 || .320 || .808 || 2.4 || 1.8 || 1.1 || 0.2 || 1.7 || 8.1

Playoffs

|-
| align="left" | 2005
| align="left" | Indiana
| 4 || 0 || 4.0 || .000 || .000 || .000 || 0.5 || 0.3 || 0.0 || 0.0 || 0.0 || 0.0
|-
| align="left" | 2006
| align="left" | Indiana
| 2 || 0 || 17.5 || .400 || .250 || .000 || 1.5 || 1.0 || 0.0 || 0.0 || 2.0 || 4.5
|-
| align="left" | 2007
| align="left" | Indiana
| 5 || 1 || 16.4 || .267 || .167 || .000 || 1.8 || 2.0 || 1.0 || 0.4 || 1.8 || 1.8
|-
| align="left" | 2008
| align="left" | Indiana
| 3 || 0 || 14.0 || .375 || .250 || 1.000 || 1.0 || 0.7 || 0.7 || 0.0 || 2.0 || 5.3
|-
| align="left" | 2011
| align="left" | Connecticut
| 2 || 0 || 21.5 || 1.000 || 1.000 || 1.000 || 2.5 || 3.0 || 1.5 || 0.0 || 2.0 || 4.0
|-
| align="left" | 2012
| align="left" | Connecticut
| 5 || 0 || 18.2 || .333 || .250 || 1.000 || 2.0 || 0.6 || 0.8 || 0.0 || 1.0 || 5.0
|-
| align="left" | 2014
| align="left" | Minnesota
| 5 || 0 || 10.2 || .333 || .400 || .500 || 1.2 || 0.4 || 1.0 || 0.0 || 0.2 || 3.2
|-
| align="left" | Career
| align="left" | 7 years, 3 teams
| 26 || 1 || 13.8 || .323 || .294 || .813 || 1.5 || 1.0 || 0.7 || 0.1 || 1.1 || 3.2

International career
White played Fenerbahçe Istanbul in 2005–06 season where she was a fan favorite for the club.
2005-2006:  Fenerbahçe Istanbul

References

External links
WNBA Player Profile
WNBA Prospect Profile
2005 WNBA Draft Board

1982 births
Living people
All-American college women's basketball players
American expatriate basketball people in Turkey
American women's basketball players
Basketball players from Mississippi
Connecticut Sun players
Fenerbahçe women's basketball players
Indiana Fever draft picks
Indiana Fever players
Minnesota Lynx players
Mississippi State Bulldogs women's basketball players
Shooting guards
Small forwards
Sportspeople from Tupelo, Mississippi
Tupelo High School alumni